Charles Crupelandt (23 October 1886, Wattrelos, Nord - 18 February 1955, Roubaix) was a French professional road bicycle racer. He won stages in the Tour de France, but his biggest successes were the 1912 and 1914 Paris–Roubaix. The last cobbled section (300m) of the race, just before the velodrome, is named Espace Charles Crupelandt.

In 1912 Charles Crupelandt became the subject of a painting by the Cubist artist and theorist Jean Metzinger. Au Vélodrome, also known as At the Cycle-Race Track and Le cycliste, illustrates the final meters of the Paris–Roubaix race and portrays its 1912 winner. Metzinger's painting was the first in Modernist art to represent a specific sporting event and its champion. He incorporated into the painting his concepts of multiple perspective, simultaneity, and time, according to his belief that the fourth dimension was crucial to the new art that could compete with the classical French tradition. The painting was acquired by Peggy Guggenheim in 1945 and is now permanently on view in the Peggy Guggenheim Collection museum in Venice.

Crupelandt went to war and returned a hero, with the Croix de Guerre. Three years into peace, however, he fell foul of the law and was found guilty. The Union Vélocipédique banned him for life, possibly at the urging of rivals in cycling.

Crupelandt raced again but with an unofficial cycling association, with which he won national championships in 1922 and 1923. He died in 1955, blind and with both legs amputated.

Major results

1910
Tour de France:
Winner 1st stage
Leading general classification for 1 day
6th place overall classification
1911
Tour de France:
Winner 4th and 7th stage
4th place overall classification
1912
Tour de France:
Winner 1st stage
Leading general classification for 1 day
 Paris–Roubaix
1913
 Paris–Tours
1914
 national road race champion
 Paris–Roubaix

References

External links 

1886 births
1955 deaths
People from Wattrelos
French male cyclists
French Tour de France stage winners
Sportspeople from Nord (French department)
Cyclists from Hauts-de-France